Claus Nieuwejaar Worsøe was a Norwegian civil servant and politician.  He served as the County Governor of Nordland county from 1867 until 1878.  In 1878, he was appointed to serve as the County Governor of Søndre Bergenhus county until his retirement in 1897.

References

1822 births
1906 deaths
County governors of Norway
County governors of Nordland